The U.S. Senate Agriculture Subcommittee on Rural Development and Energy is one of five subcommittees of the U.S. Senate Committee on Agriculture, Nutrition and Forestry.

Name changes
The subcommittee was renamed for the 115th United States Congress (2017). 

It was formerly named: 
 112th-114th Congresses: Subcommittee on Jobs, Rural Economic Growth and Energy Innovation
Prior to 112th Congress: Subcommittee on Energy, Science, and Technology.

Jurisdiction
This subcommittee has jurisdiction over legislation involving renewable energy production and energy efficiency improvement on farms and ranches and in rural communities; food and agricultural research, education, economics and extension; innovation in the use of agricultural commodities and materials.

Members, 118th Congress

External links
Subcommittee page

Agriculture Research, Nutrition, and General Legislation
Senate Agriculture Subcommittee on Research, Nutrition, and General Legislation